Jamie Hamilton Wallis (born 2 June 1984) is a British Conservative Party politician who has been the member of Parliament (MP) for Bridgend in Wales since the 2019 general election. Wallis defeated incumbent Labour MP Madeleine Moon, who had represented the constituency since 2005.

He has been described in some media reports as the first openly transgender MP in the House of Commons, following his statement in March 2022 that "I’m trans. Or to be more accurate, I want to be". He has been convicted of several driving offences and his business dealings have come under scrutiny.

Early life and education
Wallis was born in Bettws and attended St Robert's Catholic School in Aberkenfig, St Clare's School in Porthcawl and Brynteg School in Bridgend. He then read chemistry at Christ Church, Oxford, graduating in 2006 with an upper second class degree. In 2014, he was awarded a doctorate in astrobiology from Cardiff University, focusing on evidence for cometary panspermia, supervised by Chandra Wickramasinghe.

Career before politics
Wallis is one of the owners of a company called Fields Holdings Limited, the parent company of Action Direct (UK) Limited, a former claims management company of which Wallis was a director in 2011 when the Ministry of Justice banned it from taking on any further employment claims work, following an investigation into the company's conduct. He remained a director until February 2012.

In July 2010, a Freedom of Information request (2417) was made to Bridgend County Borough Council asking how many complaints or referrals to Trading Standards had been made about companies linked to him. According to the FoI response, Trading Standards had received 137 complaints about Action Direct (UK) Ltd, 166 about Fields Data Recovery Ltd, 151 about Quickie Divorce Ltd, 26 about Rapid Data Recovery Ltd, seven about Field Associates Ltd and 12 about Injunction Direct UK. The response also listed enforcement visits by Trading Standards against several of Wallis' companies. In January 2020, after being elected to Parliament, Wallis threatened to take legal action against the council over the matter under the Freedom of Information Act. In January 2022, the council stated that it had heard nothing from his lawyer since then.

Political career
Wallis was a member of Pencoed town council, representing the Hendre ward, until 2018, when he was disqualified for non-attendance. He later stated that he had resigned from the council by letter, but the council had not received the letter. He said that his reason for resigning was that he had relocated to Cowbridge, where he joined the town council.

Before he was elected as MP for Bridgend in 2019, he had stood unsuccessfully in Ogmore in the 2017 United Kingdom general election and Ogmore in the 2016 National Assembly for Wales election. At the 2019 general election he defeated incumbent Labour MP Madeleine Moon, who had represented Bridgend since 2005.

An investigation by BuzzFeed in January 2020 found that Wallis had been a co-owner of a 'sugar daddy' dating website, "which offered students financial relationships with wealthy 'sponsors'". Although Wallis initially denied links to the company, Buzzfeed found that he had been a director and shareholder of the site's parent company. The Labour MP Jess Phillips called for Wallis to have the Conservative party whip removed. Since the 2019 election, Wallis has quit as director of at least seven companies.

On the day of the second ballot of MPs in the July 2022 Conservative Party leadership election, Wallis said that he was backing the campaign of Penny Mordaunt. Wallis later called for party leader and prime minister Liz Truss to resign, citing her failure to challenge anti-transgender rhetoric in the election.

Personal life
At the time of the December 2019 general election, Wallis was married  and had two daughters, then aged six and three.

On 30 March 2022, Wallis came out as transgender, becoming the first openly transgender MP in the House of Commons. Wallis has stated that he will continue to use he/him pronouns "for the time being". He said an individual had outed him to his father and attempted to blackmail Wallis in April 2020; Wallis said the individual was prosecuted, pleaded guilty and was sentenced to 2 years and 9 months imprisonment.

Criminal convictions
In February 2022, Wallis was fined £270 and received three points on his driving licence after pleading guilty to an offence in August 2021 of "failure to comply with solid white line road markings" on the A48.

On 28 November 2021, Wallis was arrested on suspicion of driving while unfit after a car collided with a lamppost in Llanblethian, Vale of Glamorgan. On 30 March 2022, he said that he had "fled the scene" of the car collision due to having a form of post-traumatic stress disorder after being raped in September 2021. In April 2022, Wallis was charged with failing to stop following a road traffic collision, failure to report a road traffic collision, careless driving and leaving a vehicle in a dangerous position. In May he pleaded not guilty to the offences. On 11 July 2022 Wallis was found guilty of failing to stop and report an accident, leaving his car in a dangerous position, but cleared of driving without due care and attention. The court heard that Wallis was wearing "a black leather PVC miniskirt, tights, dark shoes and a pearl necklace" when he fled the scene of the crash, and that police "forced entry into the Wallis' family home address which was described as a 'mansion' and 'absolutely colossal', out of concern for the MP". Wallis said he was frightened of a group of people who came to help him. He was picked up by his father and fell asleep at home without reporting the crash to police. Wallis was fined £2,500 and disqualified from driving for six months. District Judge Tan Ikram said he "didn't find the defendant credible". Following the conviction, the Conservative Party said it "will not be taking any further action".

References

External links

1984 births
Living people
Alumni of Christ Church, Oxford
Alumni of Cardiff University
Conservative Party (UK) MPs for Welsh constituencies
Councillors in Wales
Welsh LGBT politicians
LGBT members of the Parliament of the United Kingdom
Transgender politicians
UK MPs 2019–present
British politicians convicted of crimes